The American Journal of Physics is a monthly, peer-reviewed scientific journal published by the American Association of Physics Teachers and the American Institute of Physics. The editor-in-chief is Beth Parks of Colgate University.

Aims and scope
The focus of this journal is undergraduate and graduate level physics. The intended audience is college and university physics teachers and students. Coverage includes current research in physics, instructional laboratory equipment, laboratory demonstrations, teaching methodologies, lists of resources, and book reviews. In addition, historical, philosophical and cultural aspects of physics are also covered. According to the 2021 Journal Citation Reports from Clarivate, this journal has a 2020 impact factor of 1.022.

History
The former title of this journal was American Physics Teacher (vol. 1, February 1933). It was a quarterly journal from 1933 to 1936, and then a bimonthly from 1937 to 1939. After volume 7 was published in December 1939,  the name of the journal was changed to its current title in February 1940. Hence, the publication begins under its new title with volume 8 in February 1940.

Abstracting and indexing
This journal is indexed in the following databases:
Abstract Bulletin of the Institute of Paper Chemistry (PAPERCHEM in 1969)
Applied Science & Technology Index (H.W. Wilson Company)
Chemical Abstracts
Computer & Control Abstracts
Current Index to Journals in Education (CSA Illumina - ERIC database)
Current Physics Index
Electrical & Electronics Abstracts
Energy Research Abstracts
General Science Index ( H.W. Wilson Company)
International Aerospace Abstracts
Mathematical Reviews
Physics Abstracts. Science Abstracts. Series A
SPIN

See also

European Journal of Physics
The Physics Teacher

References

External links
 American Journal of Physics
 American Journal of Physics editor's website

English-language journals
Publications established in 1933
Monthly journals
American Institute of Physics academic journals
Academic journals associated with learned and professional societies of the United States
Physics education journals